Muriyada Mane is a 1964 Indian Kannada-language film, directed by Y. R. Swamy and produced by G. H. Veeranna, C. R. Basavaraju and S. Gurunath. The film stars Rajkumar, Udaykumar, K. S. Ashwath and Balakrishna. The film has musical score by Vijaya Krishnamurthy. The film was a remake of the Tamil film Bhaaga Pirivinai.

Cast

Rajkumar as Chenna
Udaykumar
K. S. Ashwath
Balakrishna
Narasimharaju in a cameo
Srikantaswamy
Maheshwaraiah
Narayana
R. N. Magadi
Pandari Bai
Jayanthi as Malli
Papamma
Jr. Revathi
Vanisri
Indrani

Soundtrack
The music was composed by Vijaya Krishnamurthy.

References

External links
 
 

1964 films
1960s Kannada-language films
Kannada remakes of Tamil films
Films directed by Y. R. Swamy